Hildisvíni (Old Norse: , “battle swine”) is Freyja's boar In Norse mythology.

The story of Hildisvíni appears in Hyndluljóð, an Old Norse poem found in Flateyjarbok but often considered a part of the Poetic Edda. In the poem, Freyja is searching for the ancestry of her protégé, Óttar. Freyja rides on her boar Hildisvíni, who is in fact Óttar in disguise. They meet Hyndla who is a seeress.  Freyja succeeds in forcing Hyndla to tell Óttar about his ancestors.

Snorri Sturluson also records that among boar-names for helmets was Hildisvíni, the helmet of Áli. This helmet was among the things that were taken by the Swedish king Adils after his victory at the Battle on the Ice of Lake Vänern.

References
Davidson, Hilda Ellis (1998) Roles of the Northern Goddess (Routledge) 
Näsström, Britt-Mari (1995) Freyja - the Great Goddess of the North (Almqvist & Wiksell International)  
Orchard, Andy (1997) Dictionary of Norse Myth and Legend  (Cassell)  
Orel, Vladimir (2003) A Handbook of Germanic Etymology (Brill Publishers)  
Simek, Rudolf;  translated by Angela Hall (2007) Dictionary of Northern Mythology  (D.S. Brewer) 

Creatures in Norse mythology
Freyja
Mythological pigs
Wild boars